Wendy Law-Yone (born 1947) is the critically acclaimed Burmese-born American author of A Daughter's Memoir of Burma (Columbia University Press, 2014), Golden Parasol (Chatto & Windus, 2013), The Road to Wanting (Chatto & Windus, 2010), Irrawaddy Tango (Knopf, 1994), and The Coffin Tree (Knopf, 1983).

Biography
The daughter of notable Burmese newspaper publisher, editor and politician Edward Michael Law-Yone, Law-Yone was born in Mandalay but grew up in Rangoon. Her background is diverse, with one grandfather a merchant from Yunnan and another a colonial officer from Great Britain. Law-Yone states that she is "half Burman, a quarter Chinese and a quarter English".

Law-Yone has indicated that her father's imprisonment under the military regime limited her options in the country. She was barred from university, but not allowed to leave the country. In 1967, an attempt to escape to Thailand failed and she was imprisoned, but managed to leave Burma as a stateless person. She relocated to the United States in 1973, attending Eckerd College for comparative literature and modern languages before receiving a Carnegie Fellowship and settling in Washington, D.C. for thirty years. In 1987, she was the recipient of a National Endowment for the Arts Literature Award for Creative Writing. In 2002, she received a David T.K. Wong Creative Writing Fellowship from the University of East Anglia. Her novel The Road to Wanting was long-listed for the Orange Prize 2011. In 2015, she was Dürrenmatt guest professor at University of Bern, Switzerland.

Law-Yone cites as a strong influence on her writing career her father's love of language, noting that his work as the founder of Burmese English-language newspaper The Nation was a daily factor in her childhood.

Selected bibliography

 The Coffin Tree (1983)
 Irrawaddy Tango (1993)
 The Road to Wanting (2010)
 Golden Parasol: A Daughter's Memoir of Burma (2013)
 Dürrenmatt and me. Eine Passage von Burma nach Bern (2021, german-english edition)
 Aung San Suu Kyi: Politician, Prisoner, Parent (2023)

Further reading
Law-Yone, Wendy. (2010-04-03) "My Father's Burmese Newspaper, The Rangoon Nation",The Guardian.
Law-Yone, Wendy. (2003-08-25) "The Outsider", Time Magazine.

Notes

Sources

1947 births
Academics of the University of East Anglia
American women journalists of Asian descent
American women writers
Burmese emigrants to the United States
Burmese journalists
Burmese women journalists
Burmese people of Chinese descent
Burmese people of English descent
American journalists of Chinese descent
American writers of Chinese descent
Living people
People from Mandalay
People from Yangon
20th-century Burmese women writers
21st-century Burmese women writers
20th-century Burmese writers
21st-century Burmese writers
Burmese memoirists
American women academics
21st-century American women